Club Social y Deportivo Liniers is an Argentine football club from the Villegas district of La Matanza Partido, Greater Buenos Aires. The team currently plays in Primera C Metropolitana, the fourth division of the Argentine football league system.

The club was founded on 2 June 1931 as "Club Atlético Sportivo Liniers Sud". In 1941 the football team affiliated to the Argentine Football Association.

Titles
Primera C: 1
 1967

Primera D: 2
 1950, 1989–90

Team 2022 
Actually 20 March 2022

External links
Liniers en Ascenso (fan site) 
Liniers (fan site) 
Liniers es mi Equipo (fan site) 

 
Liniers
La Matanza Partido
1931 establishments in Argentina